Neil Halleen (born March 25, 1945) is an American rower. He competed in the men's quadruple sculls event at the 1976 Summer Olympics.

References

1945 births
Living people
American male rowers
Olympic rowers of the United States
Rowers at the 1976 Summer Olympics
Sportspeople from Sheboygan, Wisconsin